Scouts Guide to the Zombie Apocalypse is a 2015 American zombie comedy film directed by Christopher Landon and written by Landon, Carrie Evans, Emi Mochizuki and Lona Williams. The film stars Tye Sheridan, Logan Miller, Joey Morgan, Sarah Dumont and David Koechner. The film was released in the United States on October 30, 2015, by Paramount Pictures. It received mixed reviews from critics.

Plot
A janitor is seen cleaning in a laboratory and interrupting a scientist as he asks to clean the floors in his working area. The scientist agrees and retreats to the hallway to a vending machine. The janitor accidentally knocks off a life monitor attached to a man, in his attempt to revive the man he gives chest compressions but his hands rip through the flesh as the man awakens and attacks the janitor. Moments later, the janitor attacks the scientist in the hallway.

Three high school sophomores, Ben, Carter, and Augie, are trying to recruit new members for their Scout group, led by their Scout Leader Rogers. While Augie has always been happy about being a Scout, Ben and Carter have second thoughts. Carter tries convincing Ben to quit, but he can't as Augie is about to get his Condor Patch. Their conversation about quitting is cut short when Ben accidentally hits a deer. They manage to get help from Carter's sister, Kendall, and her friends. Ben, who's had a crush on Kendall, gets some advice from her. They all see that the supposedly-dead deer has vanished. Before they leave, the two are invited to the "Secret Seniors Party" and Carter is given the address. When they get alcohol for the party, they meet Denise, a cocktail waitress that works at a strip club. She and Ben hit it off, and she agrees to buy the alcohol for them. The two then meet up with Augie in the woods so they can set up their campsite. That night, still concerned about the disappearance of Scout Leader Rogers, the trio talk about how great their friendship has been before heading to sleep. Before the night is out, Carter wakes Ben so they can attend the party. Augie catches up, however, and is disappointed by their choice. The two drive into town to find that the bouncer for the strip club is no longer there, and they sneak in. The two are immediately attacked by a zombie bouncer and stripper before being saved by a shotgun-wielding Denise. Augie goes to Scout Leader Rogers' house to find him, only to be attacked by Scout Leader Rogers as a zombie. Augie manages to deter him, and flee the scene.

Ben, Carter, and Denise go to the police station to discover that the town has been evacuated, before a zombie horde chases them into a locked holding cell. They wait for hours when the zombies hear music from outside and leave. Augie, seeing Ben's car, runs in and unlocks the cell, freeing them. They all escape and make their way down the freeway. After walking for a bit, the four are picked up by Corporal Reeves. They drive to the party to see if anyone is evacuated, only to find that the address that was sent to Carter was fake. The group starts to argue, but Reeves was bitten before meeting them and has now turned into a zombie. Denise kills him and they try to get a signal on his radio. They hear information about bombing the town and start panicking. Carter then remembers his sister's diary has the party information in it. The four take the vehicle and drive to Carter's house. Once there, they manage to get the diary. But, more zombies arrive, and proceed to chase after the trio. They manage to escape using a trampoline to get to the now zombified neighbor, Ms. Fielder's house. From there, they take her car and head off down the road. The four find a dirt bike down the road and Denise takes it so she can get the military. Now left by themselves, Ben, Carter, and Augie weapon up at a hardware store and head to the party.

The zombies find the party, and proceed to attack the partygoers, until the trio turns up, armed with weapons and they proceed to kill the zombies.  Once they run out of ammo, they lock themselves in the building and the zombies follow them upstairs. Ben and Carter barricade the door when Augie reveals that he's built a bomb that was hidden in Ben's backpack. He manages to light the fuse when the zombies burst in and the three escape through a garbage chute just as it explodes, killing all the zombies. Denise and the military arrive at the scene, setting up medical tents and helping the survivors while the Scouts reconcile their friendship and Ben and Kendall kiss.

Cast

Production
Prior to this film Christopher Landon worked on three movies in the Paranormal Activity series and enjoyed the chance to do something more lighthearted.
He noted the comparisons in the script to various 80s movies stating "When I read the first script, I was like, 'Wow, I can actually make a gory R-rated version of The Goonies and Gremlins or even Monster Squad''' " At the same time Landon noted that he wanted the film to not be a complete throwback and wanted to modernize the genre some, a task he compared to a similar issue with Disturbia in trying to modernize a Hitchcockian thriller.

Although initially set for a March 13, 2015, date, it was eventually pushed back to October 30, 2015.

Filming
Principal photography began on May 8, 2014, in Los Angeles.

Release
In July 2015, Paramount announced that it had struck a deal with AMC Entertainment and Cineplex Entertainment to make Scouts Guide and Paranormal Activity: The Ghost Dimension available digitally, 17 days after they dropped below 300 theaters, as part of a larger experiment, and asked other theaters to join in. In return, Paramount would share an undisclosed portion of proceeds of the VOD revenues. Per industry sources, Paramount gave participating exhibitors an estimated 2 to 4 percent share of the studio's digital revenue made between the time the film dropped below 300 theaters and 90 days after its opening date. Participants in Paramount's formula include AMC, Canada's Cineplex, National Amusements, and Alamo Drafthouse. But many circuits, including Regal Cinema, Cinemark, and Carmike, rejected Paramount's offer to release in VOD. This meant that both films would only go out in roughly 1,350 North American theaters when opening on October 23 and 30—compared to 2,883 theaters for Paranormal Activity: The Marked Ones and well north of 3,000 theaters for each of the previous three PA installments. The impetus for Paramount's experimentation with this approach, with these two-younger demographic genre movies—which many have deemed box office failures—is the theatrical failure of MGM's Hot Tub Time Machine 2. Rob Moore, vice chairman of Paramount Pictures, said: "There is no question that we are going to do less theatrically, but I believe we will make it up digitally. This is about the long-term health of the business, so there is not this long period of time when a consumer can't watch a movie."

Reception
Box officeScouts Guide to the Zombie Apocalypse grossed $3.7 million in North America and $12.4 million in other territories, for a worldwide total of $16.1 million. The production budget was $24 million, and received $3 million in incentives and rebates as part of the California Film and Television Tax Credit Program.

The film opened on October 30, 2015, alongside Burnt and Our Brand Is Crisis. The film was initially projected to gross $2–4 million from 1,509 theaters in its opening weekend but ended up grossing $1.8 million, finishing 12th at the box office.

Critical response
Critic Peter Sobczynski of RogerEbert.com savaged the film as "disposable junk", calling it "loud, repellent, badly written, indifferently directed and almost completely devoid of any genuine laughs". Katie Rife from The A.V. Club gave the film a C− grade, commenting: "If Scouts Guide to the Zombie Apocalypse is the future, maybe the world should end." Tim Janson from the SciFi Movie Page rated the film 41% out of 100%, saying: "This zombie comedy is short on laughs."

, the film holds a 44% approval rating on Rotten Tomatoes, based on 97 reviews with an average rating of 4.8/10. The site's consensus reads, "Scouts Guide to the Zombie Apocalypse'' fails to live up to its intriguingly wacky title, instead delivering yet another zombie comedy-thriller with a tired T&A twist." On Metacritic, the film has a weighted average score of 32 out of 100, based on 17 critics, indicating "generally unfavorable reviews". Audiences polled by CinemaScore gave the film an average grade of B− on an A+ to F scale.

Home media
The film was released on December 8, 2015, onto Digital HD and On Demand, and on January 5, 2016, on DVD and Blu-ray.

Accolades

Soundtrack
 "Black Widow" – Performed by Iggy Azalea featuring Rita Ora
 "Air Orchestral Suite No. 3 In D Minor" – Written by Johann Sebastian Bach
 "Get Up Get Down" – Written by Peter Boyes & Oliver Silk
 "Get It Poppin'" – Performed by Kil the Giant
 "Electric Love" – Performed by Garrett Borns
 "9 to 5" – Written & performed by Dolly Parton
 'Dee Oh U Gee Eye E" – Written by Andre Lamar Bell, Lashawn Payne & Pat Kelly
 "Young at Heart" – Performed by Tim Myers featuring Rondo Brothers
 "Get Low" – Performed by Dillon Francis & DJ Snake
 "All That" – Performed by Dillon Francis featuring Twista & The Rej3ctz
 "Scars" – Performed by Basement Jaxx
 "Crank That (Soulja Boy)" – Performed by Soulja Boy
 "...Baby One More Time" – Written by Max Martin
 "Set Me Free" – Performed by Dillon Francis & Martin Garrix
 "Burial" – Performed by Yogi featuring Pusha T
 "When We Were Young" – Performed by Dillon Francis & Sultan & Shepard featuring The Chain Gang of 1974
 "Rock You Like a Hurricane" – Performed by Scorpions
 "Haunt You" – Performed by The Pack A.D.

References

External links
 
 
 
 
 

2015 films
2010s English-language films
2015 comedy horror films
2010s teen horror films
American teen horror films
American zombie comedy films
Apocalyptic films
Films about viral outbreaks
Films directed by Christopher B. Landon
Films produced by Andy Fickman
Films scored by Matthew Margeson
Films set in California
Films shot in Los Angeles
Films with screenplays by Christopher B. Landon
Paramount Pictures films
Scouting in popular culture
2010s American films